The Italian record progression for women's high jump is recognised by the Italian Athletics Federation (FIDAL).

Record progression

See also
 List of Italian records in athletics
 Women's high jump world record progression
 Women's long jump Italian record progression
 Men's high jump Italian record progression

References

high jump W